Anton Moser founded a card company in Vienna in 1824. In 1843 the company was taken over by Ferdinand Piatnik, who made the company one of the most successful card manufacturers in the world.

References 

Austrian businesspeople
Playing card manufacturers